Eveno or Evenno is a surname, and may refer to;

Eveno derives from the given name Even deriving from the Old Breton Euuen.

 , French senior civil servant and business executive
 , French urban planner and director
 , French academic, specialist in media history
 , guitarist of the band Tryo
 Michaël Eveno a.k.a. Grems (born 1978), Franco-Belgian rapper, designer and graffiti artist
 Danièle Évenou, French film, television and theater actress
 Erwan Evenou, Breton writer, linguist and political activist of the Breton language
 , French academic and political activist
 Brigitte Evanno (born 1952), French taekwondo practitioner
 , French former professional basketball player
 , French architect

References

External links
Distribution of the surname Eveno in France

Breton-language surnames